Edmund 'Edi' Stöhr (born 17 September 1956, in Kösching) is a German football manager and former player.

Honours
As a manager
Austrian Football First League:
 1996–97

Managerial career
After retiring, he became a manager. He has managed SC Austria Lustenau on 3 separate occasions.

References

External links
 

1956 births
Living people
German footballers
Hertha BSC players
SpVgg Unterhaching players
German football managers
SC Austria Lustenau managers
Association football defenders